The Nelson Mandela Championship was a golf tournament, played for the first time in December 2012. It was played in Durban, South Africa and was co-sanctioned by the European Tour and the Sunshine Tour. It was sponsored by the Nelson Mandela Children's Fund. It was the first event of the 2013 European Tour.

The first ever event was reduced to 36 holes due to rain and in order for the tournament to commence the course was reduced to a par 65 and was 1600 yards shorter. The tournament ended in a playoff. Eduardo de la Riva dropped out with a bogey on the first extra hole, Steve Webster made a bogey on the second extra hole, and Scott Jamieson won with a par. It was his first European Tour victory in his 65th event. 

The second event was a week after Nelson Mandela's death. His funeral was on Sunday 15 December so the tournament was moved forward one day and played Wednesday through Saturday, 11–14 December. Again, this tournament was suspended several times due to a water-logged course and shortened to 54 holes. Spain's Jorge Campillo and South Africa's Colin Nel shot 59 in the second round, but the European Tour considers them unofficial after the use preferred lies and placement. South Africa's Dawie van der Walt earned his second European Tour win.

Winners

Notes

References

External links

Coverage on European Tour's official site

Former Sunshine Tour events
Former European Tour events
Golf tournaments in South Africa
International Sports Promotion Society